This is a list of candidates for the 1872 New South Wales colonial election. The election was held from 13 February to 28 March 1872.

There was no recognisable party structure at this election.

Retiring Members
Archibald Bell MLA (Upper Hunter)
Arthur Dight MLA (Windsor)
James Fallon MLA (Hume)
James Hart MLA (Monaro)
Lewis Levy MLA (Liverpool Plains)
John Morrice MLA (Camden)
James Osborne MLA (Illawarra)
William Speer MLA (West Sydney)
John Suttor MLA (East Macquarie)
William Suttor MLA (Bathurst)

Legislative Assembly
Sitting members are shown in bold text. Successful candidates are highlighted.

Electorates are arranged chronologically from the day the poll was held. Because of the sequence of polling, some sitting members who were defeated in their constituencies were then able to contest other constituencies later in the polling period. On the second occasion, these members are shown in italic text.

See also
 Members of the New South Wales Legislative Assembly, 1872–1874

References
 

1872